Connor James Ruane (born 15 November 1993) is an English professional footballer who plays as a midfielder for Linense.

Early and personal life
Ruane moved from Warrington to Spain when he was 9 years old.

Career
In January 2021 he signed for Bulgarian club Lokomotiv Plovdiv. He moved to Spanish club Linense in January 2022.

References

1993 births
Living people
English footballers
Everton F.C. players
CE Constància players
RCD Mallorca B players
Hércules CF players
La Roda CF players
FC Jumilla players
FC Inter Turku players
PFC Lokomotiv Plovdiv players
Real Balompédica Linense footballers
Segunda División B players
Veikkausliiga players
First Professional Football League (Bulgaria) players
Primera Federación players
Association football midfielders
English expatriate footballers
English expatriate sportspeople in Spain
Expatriate footballers in Spain
English expatriate sportspeople in Finland
Expatriate footballers in Finland
English expatriate sportspeople in Bulgaria
Expatriate footballers in Bulgaria